The United States of America (USA) competed at the 1988 Summer Olympics in Seoul, South Korea. 527 competitors, 332 men and 195 women, took part in 230 events in 27 sports. The United States finished outside of the top two in the overall medal count (third behind the Soviet Union and East Germany) for the first time and in the gold medal count for only the second time. That was mainly caused by the extensive state-sponsored doping programs that were developed in these communist countries to fulfil their political agenda on an international stage.

Medalists

The following U.S. competitors won medals at the games. In the by discipline sections below, medalists' names are bolded. 

|style="text-align:left; width:78%; vertical-align:top;"|

|  style="text-align:left; width:22%; vertical-align:top;"|

* - Indicates that the athlete competed in preliminaries but not the final.

Archery

The United States continued to be a strong contender in archery, though it found that South Korea had taken the top spot in the sport.  Jay Barrs was the only non-Korean to win a gold medal for archery in Seoul.  Two-time gold medallist Darrell Pace and 1984 silver medallist Richard McKinney joined Barrs in winning the team silver, while the women's team added a bronze medal despite not having any of the individual archers advance to the final. With her women's team bronze, 15-year-old Denise Parker become the youngest medalist in the history of Olympic archery.

Men

Women

Athletics

The men's 100 meter sprint was marred by the usage of performance-enhancing drugs when the initial winner, Canadian sprinter Ben Johnson, tested positive for banned substances after the race and was stripped of the gold medal and his world record time of 9.79 seconds, thus allowing Carl Lewis to repeat as gold medal winner. In 1989, Johnson admitted to further PED usage between 1981 and 1988 and his world record of 9.83 seconds from the 1987 World Championships was rescinded as well, allowing Lewis's 9.92 seconds in the Olympic final became the new world record. This put the United States in position to sweep the gold medals in the men's sprint distances, including a sweep of all medals at the 400 meter distance. The United States men also won medals while setting Olympic records at both hurdle distances. In the men's relays, a fumbled baton exchange in the heat of the 4 × 100 caused a heartbreaking disqualification for the favored American team. In the 4 × 400, however, the United States cruised to victory while equaling the 20-year-old world record which had been set in Mexico City. In men's field events, the highlight came from Carl Lewis defending his gold medal from Los Angeles and leading the United States to a medal sweep in the long jump. In the women's events, Florence Griffth-Joyner had dominating performances in the 100 and 200 meter sprints, lowering the Olympic record by over 0.2 seconds in the 100 and lowering the world record by almost 0.4 seconds in the 200. She also helped the United States to strong performances in the relays, winning gold in the 4 × 100 and coming in second, while beating the previous world record, to a record-shattering performance by the Soviet team in the 4 × 400. Meanwhile, in the heptathlon, Jackie Joyner-Kersee dominated the competition while setting a world record that has not been approached in the succeeding 30 years. Joyner-Kersee's long jump performance in the heptathlon was enough to set the Olympic record for the discipline, only for her to eclipse it in the final of the long jump event. The high jump event also saw Louise Ritter eclipse the Olympic record on the way to a gold medal. Finally, the only United States medal in the middle distance events came from Kim Gallagher, who captured bronze in the 800 meters.

Men
Track and road events

* - Indicates the athlete ran in a preliminary round but not the final.

Field events

Combined event – Decathlon

Women

* - Indicates the athlete ran in a preliminary round but not the final.** - Griffith-Joyner's final time was faster than the Olympic record she had set in the quarterfinal but the wind reading during the race was 3 meters/second in favor of the sprinters, thus disallowing the race for any IAAF records.

Field events

Combined event – Heptathlon

Basketball

Summary

Men's tournament

This was the last time that the United States was represented by college players in Olympic competition. Other countries, meanwhile, used their best professionals.
Roster

Group play

Quarterfinal

Semifinal

Bronze medal game

Women's tournament

Team roster

Group play

Semifinal

Gold medal game

Boxing

There were several controversies involving the American boxers at the games. Young and talented Roy Jones Jr. dominated his opponents, never losing a round en route to the final, where he controversially lost a 3–2 decision to South Korean fighter Park Si-Hun despite pummeling Park for three rounds and landing 86 punches to Park's 32.
The decision sparked outrage and an International Olympic Committee investigation found that the three judges who voted for Park Si-Hun had been bribed by South Korean officials.
With some elements of corruption in Olympic boxing coming to light, refereeing standards were changed after the games to avoid future controversies. Corruption was also suspected in Michael Carbajal's decision loss in his gold medal match. 
In another controversial gold medal match, Riddick Bowe lost to future world heavyweight champion Lennox Lewis. After Lewis landed several hard punches the referee gave Bowe two standing eight counts and waved the fight off after the second one, even though Bowe seemed able to continue. In yet another controversy, Michael Carbajal lost the gold medal bout in the light flyweight, with suspicions of politics influencing the judges decision being quite widespread. Members of the U.S. Army Boxing Team (Anthony Hembrick, Andrew Maynard, Kennedy McKinney, Ray Mercer) trained for the Olympics at Fort Huachuca, Arizona.

Furthermore, middleweight Anthony Hembrick never had the opportunity to fight. Hembrick and his coach, Ken Adams, misinterpreted the fight schedule. Afterwards, they blamed the schedule for being too confusing. By the time Hembrick arrived at Chamshil Students' Gymnasium twelve minutes late, he had been disqualified and the match was being awarded to South Korean Ha Jong-ho.

Canoeing

Men

Women

Key: QF – Qualified to medal final; SF – Qualified to semifinal; R – Qualified to repechage; * - Heat not held due to lack of competitors. All competitors scheduled for this heat advanced to the next round.

Cycling

Nineteen cyclists represented the United States in 1988. Connie Paraskevin-Young won bronze in the women's sprint.

Road

Track

Points race

Pursuit

Sprint

Time trial

Diving

Men

Women

Equestrian

Dressage

Eventing

Jumping

Fencing

19 fencers represented the United States in 1988.

Men

Women

Field hockey

Summary

Women's tournament
The US women's field hockey team competed for the second time at the Summer Olympics.

Roster
 ( 1.) Patty Shea (gk)
 ( 2.) Yolanda Hightower
 ( 3.) Mary Koboldt
 ( 4.) Marcia Pankratz
 ( 5.) Cheryl Van Kuren
 ( 6.) Diane Bracalente
 ( 7.) Beth Beglin
 ( 8.) Marcella Place
 ( 9.) Sandra Vander-Heyden
 (10.) Tracey Fuchs
 (11.) Sheryl Johnson
 (12.) Sandra Costigan
 (13.) Christy Morgan
 (14.) Barbara Marois
 (15.) Megan Donnelly
 (16.) Donna Lee

Head coach: Boudewijn Castelijn

Preliminary round
Group A

5th-8th place classification

8th place game

Football

Summary

Roster
Head coach: Lothar Osiander

Preliminary round

Gymnastics

Artistic

Men
Team

Individual finals

Women
Team

Individual finals

Rhythmic

Handball

Summary

Judo

Modern pentathlon

Three pentathletes represented the United States in 1988.

Rowing

Men

Women

* - Race not run, times from heats were used to rank boats.Qualification legend: FA = Final A (medal); FB = Final B (non-medal); SF = Semifinal; R = Repechage

Sailing

Men

Women

Open

Shooting

Men

Women

Open shotgun

Swimming

Men

Women

* - Athlete swam in the heat but not the final.
Note: Times in the first round ranked across all heats.
Qualification legend: FA – Advance to medal final; FB – Advance to non-medal final

Synchronized swimming

Three female synchronized swimmers represented the United States in 1988.

Table tennis

Tennis

Men

Women

Volleyball

Summary

Men's tournament
 Preliminary round (group B)
 United states – Japan 3-0 (15-13, 15-2, 15-2)
 United states – The Netherlands 3-1 (15-7, 12-15, 15-1, 15-11)
 United states – Argentina 3-2 (11-15, 11-15, 15-4, 17-15, 15-7)
 United states – France 3-0 (17-15, 15-6, 15-13)
 United states – Tunisia 3-0 (15-4, 15-6, 15-4)
 Semi Finals
 United states – Brazil 3-0 (15-3, 15-5, 15-11)
 Final
 United states – Soviet Union 3-1 (13-15, 15-10, 15-4, 15-8)

Team roster
 Craig Buck
 Bob Ctvrtlik
 Scott Fortune
 Karch Kiraly
 Ricci Luyties
 Doug Partie
 Jon Root
 Eric Sato
 Dave Saunders
 Jeff Stork
 Steve Timmons
 Troy Tanner
Head coach: Marv Dunphy

Women's tournament
 Preliminary round (group B)
 Lost to PR China (0-3)
 Defeated Brazil (3-2)
 Lost to Peru (2-3)
 Classification Matches
 5th/8th place: Lost to East Germany (1-3)
 7th/8th place: Defeated South Korea (3-2)

Team roster
 Deitre Collins
 Caren Kemner
 Laurel Kessel
 Liz Masakayan
 Jayne McHugh
 Melissa McLinden
 Kim Oden
 Prikeba Phipps
 Angela Rock
 Kimberly Ruddins
 Liane Sato
 Tammy Webb
Head coach: Terry Liskevych

Water polo

Summary

Roster
 Craig Wilson
 Kevin Robertson
 James Bergeson
 Peter Campbell
 Douglas Kimbell
 Edward Klass
 Alan Mouchawar
 Jeffrey Campbell
 Greg Boyer
 Terry Schroeder
 Jody Campbell
 Christopher Duplanty
 Michael Evans
Head coach: Bill Barnett

Preliminary round

Semifinal

Gold medal game

Weightlifting

Wrestling

See also
United States at the 1987 Pan American Games
United States at the 1988 Summer Paralympics

References

Nations at the 1988 Summer Olympics
1988
Oly